Avocado Toast is a Canadian comedy-drama web series, which premiered in 2020 on OutTVGo. The series stars Heidi Lynch as Molly, a woman in her early 30s who unexpectedly falls in love with a woman for the first time, and learns after coming out as bisexual to her parents that they have been in an open marriage for many years; meanwhile, her best friend Elle (Perrie Voss) simultaneously discovers that her mother is having an affair with a man young enough to be her brother.

The series was based in part on Lynch and Voss's own real-life experiences.

The cast also includes Faye Marsay, Brenda Robins, Kristian Bruun, Nelu Handa, Scott Cavalheiro, Andrew Moodie, Mag Ruffman and Prince Amponsah.

Awards

References

External links

2020 web series debuts
Canadian comedy-drama web series
Canadian LGBT-related web series
OutTV (Canadian TV channel) original programming
2020 Canadian television series debuts
2020s Canadian comedy television series